The Showgrounds is a football stadium in Coleraine, County Londonderry, Northern Ireland. It is the home ground of Coleraine F.C. The stadium holds approximately 3,500 with the stadium consisting of a mix of terracing and seating.

Between September 1971 and October 1972, Derry City F.C. were forced to use the stadium as their home-ground after the Irish Football Association banned the use of their ground in Derry, the Brandywell, due to security fears emanating from the Trouble and civil unrest in the nearby Bogside area. Derry's use ended in 1972 when, faced with dwindling crowds, travelling to Coleraine to play home-games was no longer financially sustainable.

Milk Cup 

The Showgrounds also hosts the Milk Cup finals and main matches. The Milk Cup is an international youth football tournament which features both international teams and league clubs from around the world.

References

External links
 The Ulster Groundhop video tour 
IFCP photos from The Coleraine Showgrounds
 Official Site

Association football venues in Northern Ireland
Sports venues in County Londonderry
Coleraine
Sports venues completed in 1907
1907 establishments in Ireland
Derry City F.C.
Coleraine F.C.